Martinice is a municipality and village in Žďár nad Sázavou District in the Vysočina Region of the Czech Republic. It has about 500 inhabitants.

History
The first written mention of Martinice is from 1344.

References

Villages in Žďár nad Sázavou District